Rolandz is a dansband from Sweden, established in 2008 by Robert Gustafsson. The breakthrough was during a Dansbandskampen break appearance in 2008. In 2009, the band participated at Allsång på Skansen on 7 July 2009.

Singer and lead man of Rolandz is the character Roland Järverup, whom Robert Gustafsson played in the 1999 movie Screwed in Tallinn by Killinggänget. Later, the idea was hatched to create Rolandz using the Roland Järverup character.

Rolandz competed in Melodifestivalen 2018 with the song Fuldans, and finished in 10th place in the grand final.

Discography

Albums

Singles

DVDs
2009: Rolandz – the Movie
2010: Rolandz danzar igen
2011: Rolandz – Fadersjakten

References

External links
Official website

2008 establishments in Sweden
Dansbands
Musical groups established in 2008
Melodifestivalen contestants of 2018